The 2006 Minnesota Twins Season was the Minnesota Twin's 46th season playing in the Twin Cities and their 106th season in the American League. They were managed by Ron Gardenhire and played their home games in the Metrodome.

The Twins finished first in the American League Central with a 96-66 record. They were swept in three games by the Oakland Athletics in the 2006 American League Division Series.

Offseason
 January 31, 2006: Rubén Sierra was signed as a free agent by the Twins.
 March 29, 2006: Rob Bowen was selected off waivers from the Twins by the Detroit Tigers.

Regular season

The Twins stumbled out of the gate after the death of Hall of Famer Kirby Puckett in late March, accumulating a dismal 25-33 record by June 7.  Around that time, the team dropped underperforming veterans like Tony Batista, Juan Castro, and Kyle Lohse, replacing them with talented rookies from the Rochester Red Wings.  The Twins went 9-1 in their next ten games, evening their record at 34-34. Interleague play was particularly generous to the team; the Twins had Major League Baseball's best Interleague record at 16 wins and 2 losses. By July 26 the team had won 34 of 42 games, leaving them tied with the White Sox at 59-41, but still 8.5 games behind the division-leading Tigers.

As the season neared its conclusion, the Twins continued to put distance between them and the White Sox, while gaining on the Tigers. A key series starting on September 7 saw the Twins take three out of four from the Tigers. And after a commanding win in Boston on September 19, the Twins found themselves within a half game of the Central-leading Tigers. On September 25, the Twins beat Kansas City 8-1 to secure an American League playoff berth.

A win in a 10-inning game against the Royals on September 28 moved the Twins into a tie with the Tigers atop the AL Central.  With that win, the Twins broke a major league record by moving into first place after the team's 159th game.  This was the latest in a season that a team moved into first place for the first time all season.  (It was a tie for first at this point.)

The Tigers led the season series, so a tie at the end of the season between the Tigers and Twins would have meant the Twins get the wild card.  Instead, the Tigers were swept by 100-game-losers Kansas City to end the season, and the Twins took one of three from the White Sox, giving the Twins their fourth AL Central title in five years.  It was the first time in major league history that a team clinched on the last day of the season after never having held sole possession of first place.

The representatives of the Twins in the All-Star Game were Johan Santana, Joe Mauer, and Francisco Liriano.
The highest paid Twin in 2006 is Torii Hunter at $10,750,000.00.
The motto for the 2006 Twins was "Smell 'em."  Backup catcher Mike Redmond coined the phrase, saying the hitters have to "smell those RBIs" when they see runners in scoring position in key situations.  Hitters will tap their noses when they come through.  After a 9-5 victory over the Detroit Tigers on September 8 that followed a two-week-long hitting drought, hitting coach Joe Vavra remarked: "The 'smell 'ems' were out again tonight.  That's the good feeling we were missing."
In reference to the scrappy, fleet-footed hitters that make up almost half of their lineup, many of the Twins' players have been referred to by Chicago White Sox manager Ozzie Guillén as "little piranhas". The moniker has stuck, and the team has printed and markets T-shirts bearing the nickname.
Johan Santana won his second Cy Young Award, a unanimous decision. He also won the pitching triple crown, leading the majors in wins, strikeouts, and ERA. The last pitcher to lead both leagues in all 3 categories was Dwight Gooden in 1985.
Justin Morneau won his first AL MVP Award, a decision won narrowly over New York Yankees shortstop Derek Jeter 320 points to 306 points, with 15 of a possible 28 first place votes.  He was the first Twins MVP since Rod Carew in 1977.
Joe Mauer was the first American League catcher ever to win the Major League Baseball batting crown.

Season standings

Record vs. opponents

Notable transactions
 June 14, 2006: Tony Batista designated for assignment.  He was released on the 19th and cleared waivers on the 21st.
 June 15, 2006: Juan Castro traded to the Cincinnati Reds for outfielder Brandon Roberts.
 July 10, 2006: Rubén Sierra was released by the Twins.
 July 31, 2006: Kyle Lohse traded to the Cincinnati Reds for Minor League RHP Zach Ward.
 August 31, 2006: The Twins acquired veteran Phil Nevin from the Chicago Cubs for a player to be named later (Adam Harben).

Roster

Game log 

|- style="background-color:#ffbbbb"
| 1 || April 4 || @ Blue Jays || 6–3 || Halladay || Santana || Ryan || 50,449 || 0–1
|- style="background-color:#bbffbb"
| 2 || April 5 || @ Blue Jays || 13–4 || Radke || Towers || || 18,156 || 1–1
|- style="background-color:#ffbbbb"
| 3 || April 6 || @ Blue Jays || 6–3 || Chacín || Silva || Ryan || 16,221 || 1–2
|- style="background-color:#ffbbbb"
| 4 || April 7 || @ Indians || 11–6 || Byrd || Lohse || || 42,445 || 1–3
|- style="background-color:#ffbbbb"
| 5 || April 8 || @ Indians || 3–0 || Johnson || Baker || Wickman || 25,107 || 1–4
|- style="background-color:#ffbbbb"
| 6 || April 9 || @ Indians || 3–2 || Westbrook || Santana || Wickman || 23,311 || 1–5
|- style="background-color:#bbffbb"
| 7 || April 11 || Athletics || 7–6 || Radke || Haren || Nathan || 48,911 || 2–5
|- style="background-color:#bbffbb"
| 8 || April 12 || Athletics || 6–5 || Silva || Loaiza || Nathan || 22,603 || 3–5
|- style="background-color:#bbffbb"
| 9 || April 13 || Athletics || 8–2 || Lohse || Blanton || || 13,520 || 4–5
|- style="background-color:#bbffbb"
| 10 || April 14 || Yankees || 5–1 || Baker || Mussina || || 30,622 || 5–5
|- style="background-color:#bbffbb"
| 11 || April 15 || Yankees || 6–5 || Rincón || Rivera || || 42,316 || 6–5
|- style="background-color:#ffbbbb"
| 12 || April 16 || Yankees || 9–3 || Wang || Radke || || 22,627 || 6–6
|- style="background-color:#ffbbbb"
| 13 || April 18 || Angels || 8–2 || Escobar || Silva || Shields || 15,757 || 6–7
|- style="background-color:#bbffbb"
| 14 || April 19 || Angels || 12–10 || Nathan || Romero ||  || 21,507 || 7–7
|- style="background-color:#ffbbbb"
| 15 || April 20 || Angels || 6–4 || Gregg || Crain || Rodríguez || 12,990 || 7–8
|- style="background-color:#ffbbbb"
| 16 || April 21 || @ White Sox || 7–1 || Buehrle || Santana || || 31,287 || 7–9
|- style="background-color:#ffbbbb"
| 17 || April 22 || @ White Sox || 9–2 || García || Radke || || 38,955 || 7–10
|- style="background-color:#ffbbbb"
| 18 || April 23 || @ White Sox || 7–3 || Contreras || Silva || || 38,102 || 7–11
|- style="background-color:#bbffbb"
| 19 || April 25 || @ Royals || 2–1 || Liriano || Hudson || Nathan || 12,911 || 8–11
|- style="background-color:#ffbbbb"
| 20 || April 26 || @ Royals || 3–1 || Hernández || Baker || Burgos || 9,188 || 8–12
|- style="background-color:#bbffbb"
| 21 || April 27 || @ Royals || 7–3 || Santana || Redman || || 11,391 || 9–12
|- style="background-color:#ffbbbb"
| 22 || April 28 || @ Tigers || 9–0 || Robertson || Radke || || 23,263 || 9–13
|- style="background-color:#ffbbbb"
| 23 || April 29 || @ Tigers || 18–1 || Verlander || Silva || || 24,258 || 9–14
|- style="background-color:#ffbbbb"
| 24 || April 30 || @ Tigers || 6–0 || Rogers || Lohse || || 24,323 || 9–15

|- style="background-color:#ffbbbb"
| 25 || May 1 || Mariners || 8–2 || Piñeiro|| Baker|| || 11,796|| 9–16
|- style="background-color:#bbffbb"
| 26 || May 2 || Mariners || 5–1 || Santana|| Washburn|| || 14,513||10–16
|- style="background-color:#bbffbb"
| 27 || May 3 || Royals || 6–1 || Radke || Mays|| || 15,996||11–16
|- style="background-color:#ffbbbb"
| 28 || May 4 || Royals || 1–0 || Affeldt||Silva || Burgos|| 11,803|| 11–17
|- style="background-color:#ffbbbb"
| 29 || May 5 || Tigers || 9–6 ||Rogers ||Lohse ||Jones || 23,892 ||11–18
|- style="background-color:#bbffbb"
| 30 || May 6 || Tigers ||7–6 ||Rincón ||Jones || ||20,907 || 12–18
|- style="background-color:#bbffbb"
| 31 || May 7 || Tigers ||4–2 ||Santana ||Maroth ||Nathan ||20,548 || 13–18
|- style="background-color:#ffbbbb"
| 32 || May 8 || @ Rangers ||6–4 ||Koronka ||Radke ||Otsuka ||18,609 || 13–19
|- style="background-color:#bbffbb"
| 33 || May 9 || @ Rangers || 15–5|| Silva||Millwood || ||19,316 || 14–19
|- style="background-color:#bbffbb"
| 34 || May 10 || @ Rangers || 4–3 ||Loshe ||Padilla ||Nathan ||23,008 || 15–19
|- style="background-color:#bbffbb"
| 35 || May 12 || White Sox ||10–1 ||Santana ||Garland || ||30,473 ||16–19
|- style="background-color:#bbffbb"
| 36 || May 13 || White Sox ||8–4 || Radke||Vázquez || || 33,021||17–19
|- style="background-color:#ffbbbb"
| 37 || May 14 || White Sox ||9–7 ||Buehrle ||Silva ||Jenks ||21,796 ||17–20
|- style="background-color:#ffbbbb"
| 38 || May 15 || White Sox ||7–3 ||García ||Baker || ||19,413 ||17–21
|- style="background-color:#ffbbbb"
| 39 || May 16 || @ Tigers ||7–4 || Robertson|| Lohse ||Jones || 18,115|| 17–22
|- style="background-color:#ffbbbb"
| 40 || May 17 || @ Tigers ||2–0 ||Verlander ||Santana ||Jones ||16,669 || 17–23
|- style="background-color:#ffbbbb"
| 41 || May 18 || @ Tigers || 5–3||Rogers ||Radke || Jones || 26,732||17–24
|- style="background-color:#bbffbb"
| 42 || May 19 || @ Brewers ||7–1 ||Liriano ||Davis || || 28,462||18–24
|- style="background-color:#bbffbb"
| 43 || May 20 || @ Brewers ||16–10 ||Baker || Hendrickson|| ||43,422 ||19–24
|- style="background-color:#ffbbbb"
| 44 || May 21 || @ Brewers || 5–3||Capuano ||Crain ||Turnbow ||35,180 || 19–25
|- style="background-color:#bbffbb"
| 45 || May 23 || Indians ||6–5 ||Nathan ||Mota || ||19,334 ||20–25
|- style="background-color:#ffbbbb"
| 46 || May 24 || Indians || 11–0||Sabathia ||Radke || ||22,789 ||20–26
|- style="background-color:#bbffbb"
| 47 || May 26 || Mariners ||3–1 ||Liriano ||Hernández ||Nathan ||28,082 ||21–26
|- style="background-color:#bbffbb"
| 48 || May 27 ||Mariners||9–5 ||Bonser ||Moyer ||Rincón ||25,305 ||22–26
|- style="background-color:#bbffbb"
| 49 || May 28 || Matiners ||4–3 ||Nathan ||Guardado || ||24,388 ||23–26
|- style="background-color:#ffbbbb"
| 50 || May 29 || @ Angels||4–3 ||Shields ||Crain || ||40,007 ||23–27
|- style="background-color:#ffbbbb"
| 51 || May 30 || @ Angels || 6–3||Weaver ||Baker ||Rodríguez ||37,299 ||23–28
|- style="background-color:#bbffbb"
| 52 || May 31 || @ Angels || 7–1||Liriano ||Santana || ||40,001 ||24–28

|- style="background-color:#ffbbbb"
| 53 || June 1 || @ Athletics ||4–0 ||Zito ||Bonser || ||12,025 ||24–29
|- style="background-color:#bbffbb"
| 54 || June 2 || @ Athletics ||2–1 ||Santana ||Saarloos ||Nathan ||16,138 ||25–29
|- style="background-color:#ffbbbb"
| 55 || June 3 || @ Athletics ||2–1 ||Halsey ||Radke ||Street ||23,194 ||25–30
|- style="background-color:#ffbbbb"
| 56 || June 4 || @ Athletics ||5–1 ||Halsey ||Silva || ||25,247 ||25–31
|- style="background-color:#ffbbbb"
| 57 || June 6 || @ Mariners || 4–2||Hernández ||Liriano ||Putz ||21,028 ||25–32
|- style="background-color:#ffbbbb"
| 58 || June 7 || @ Mariners || 10–9||Mateo ||Crain || ||24,785 ||25–33
|- style="background-color:#bbffbb"
| 59 || June 8 || @ Mariners || 7–3||Santana ||Piñeiro || ||27,341 ||26–33
|- style="background-color:#bbffbb"
| 60 || June 9 || Orioles || 7–5||Nathan ||Chen || ||22,894 ||27–33
|- style="background-color:#ffbbbb"
| 61 || June 10 || Orioles || 9–7||Cabrera ||Silva || ||24,478 ||27–34
|- style="background-color:#bbffbb"
| 62 || June 11 || Orioles || 4–0||Liriano ||Bédard || ||25,438 ||28–34
|- style="background-color:#bbffbb"
| 63 || June 13 || Red Sox || 5–2||Reyes ||Tavárez || ||25,531 ||29–34
|- style="background-color:#bbffbb"
| 64 || June 14 || Red Sox || 8–1||Radke ||Clement || ||26,492 ||30–34
|- style="background-color:#bbffbb"
| 65 || June 15 || Red Sox || 5–3||Silva ||Wakefield ||Nathan ||21,191 ||31–34
|- style="background-color:#bbffbb"
| 66 || June 16 || @ Pirates || 4–2||Liriano ||Snell ||Nathan ||33,025 ||32–34
|- style="background-color:#bbffbb"
| 67 || June 17 || @ Pirates || 5–3||Crain ||Marte ||Nathan ||34,085 ||33–34
|- style="background-color:#bbffbb"
| 68 || June 18 || @ Pirates || 8–2||Santana ||Pérez || ||25,104 ||34–34
|- style="background-color:#bbffbb"
| 69 || June 20 || @ Astros || 6–5||Nathan ||Miller || ||32,713 ||35–34
|- style="background-color:#ffbbbb"
| 70 || June 21 || @ Astros || 5–3||Wheeler ||Lohse ||Lidge ||33,243 ||35–35
|- style="background-color:#bbffbb"
| 71 || June 22 || @ Astros || 4–2||Liriano ||Clemens ||Nathan ||43,769 ||36–35
|- style="background-color:#bbffbb"
| 72 || June 23 || Cubs || 7–2||Santana ||Mármol || ||34,361 ||37–35
|- style="background-color:#bbffbb"
| 73 || June 24 || Cubs || 3–0||Bonser ||Prior ||Nathan ||42,304 ||38–35
|- style="background-color:#bbffbb"
| 74 || June 25 || Cubs || 8–1||Radke ||Marshall || ||35,128 ||39–35
|- style="background-color:#bbffbb"
| 75 || June 26 || Dodgers || 8–2||Silva ||Billingsley || ||22,258 ||40–35
|- style="background-color:#bbffbb"
| 76 || June 27 || Dodgers || 9–2||Liriano ||Lowe || ||30,681 ||41–35
|- style="background-color:#bbffbb"
| 77 || June 28 || Dodgers || 6–3||Santana ||Pérez ||Nathan ||34,157 ||42–35
|- style="background-color:#bbffbb"
| 78 || June 30 || Brewers || 8–2||Radke ||Villanueva || ||28,412 ||43–35

|- style="background-color:#bbffbb"
| 79 || July 1 || Brewers || 10–7||Rincón ||Turnbow ||Nathan  ||35,056 ||44–35
|- style="background-color:#bbffbb"
| 80 || July 2 || Brewers || 8–0||Liriano ||Jackson || ||35,466 ||45–35
|- style="background-color:#bbffbb"
| 81 || July 3 || @ Royals || 6–5||Crain ||Sisco ||Nathan||28,401 ||46–35
|- style="background-color:#ffbbbb"
| 82 || July 4 || @ Royals || 7–2||Gobble ||Bonser ||Dessens ||23,996 ||46–36
|- style="background-color:#ffbbbb"
| 83 || July 5 || @ Royals || 6–3||Affeldt ||Crain ||Burgos ||12,085 ||46–37
|- style="background-color:#ffbbbb"
| 84 || July 7 || @ Rangers || 9–4||Wasdin ||Silva || ||30,207 ||46–38
|- style="background-color:#bbffbb"
| 85 || July 8 || @ Rangers || 4–0||Liriano ||Rheinecker || ||36,035 ||47–38
|- style="background-color:#ffbbbb"
| 86 || July 9 || @ Rangers || 5–2||Bauer ||Santana ||Otsuka ||23,268 ||47–39
|- style="background-color:#ffbbbb"
| 87 || July 13 || Indians || 6–4||Lee ||Liriano ||Wickman ||21,085 ||47–40
|- style="background-color:#bbffbb"
| 88 || July 14 || Indians || 3–2||Nathan ||Mujica || ||21,279 ||48–40
|- style="background-color:#bbffbb"
| 89 || July 15 || Indians || 6–2||Santana ||Sabathia || ||33,904 ||49–40
|- style="background-color:#bbffbb"
| 90 || July 16 || Indians || 5–2||Silva ||Sowers ||Nathan ||31,838 ||50–40
|- style="background-color:#bbffbb"
| 91 || July 17 || Devil Rays || 6–3||Baker ||Corcoran ||Nathan ||17,071 ||51–40
|- style="background-color:#bbffbb"
| 92 || July 18 || Devil Rays || 8–1||Liriano ||Kazmir || ||22,808 ||52–40
|- style="background-color:#bbffbb"
| 93 || July 19 || Devil Rays || 7–2||Radke ||Seo || ||25,866 ||53–40
|- style="background-color:#bbffbb"
| 94 || July 20 || Devil Rays || 6–4||Santana ||Shields ||Nathan ||25,104 ||54–40
|- style="background-color:#bbffbb"
| 95 || July 21 || @ Indians || 14–6||Reyes ||Sabathia || ||29,695 ||55–40
|- style="background-color:#ffbbbb"
| 96 || July 22 || @ Indians || 11–0||Sowers ||[[Scott Baker (right-handed pitcher)|Baker]] || ||26,895 ||55–41
|- style="background-color:#bbffbb"
| 97 || July 23 || @ Indians || 3–1||Liriano ||Westbrook ||Nathan ||25,889 ||56–41
|- style="background-color:#bbffbb"
| 98 || July 24 || @ White Sox || 7–4||Radke ||Vázquez || ||39,750 ||57–41
|- style="background-color:#bbffbb"
| 99 || July 25 || @ White Sox || 4–3||Santana ||Contreras ||Nathan ||36,984 ||58–41
|- style="background-color:#bbffbb"
| 100 || July 26 || @ White Sox || 7–4||Silva ||Buehrle || Nathan ||39,387 ||59–41
|- style="background-color:#ffbbbb"
| 101|| July 28 || Tigers || 3–2||Rodney ||Rincon ||Jones ||45,478 ||59–42
|- style="background-color:#ffbbbb"
| 102|| July 29 || Tigers || 8–6||Robertson ||Radke ||Jones ||45,496 ||59–43
|- style="background-color:#bbffbb"
| 103|| July 30 || Tigers || 6–4||Neshek ||Bonderman ||Nathan ||43,204 ||60–43
|- style="background-color:#bbffbb"
| 104|| July 31 || Rangers || 15–2||Silva ||Rheinecker || ||19,532 ||61–43

|- style="background-color:#ffbbbb"
| 105 || August 1 || Rangers || 9–0||Eaton ||Baker || ||25,969 ||61–44
|- style="background-color:#ffbbbb"
| 106 || August 2 || Rangers || 10–2||Wells ||Bonser || ||26,492 ||61–45
|- style="background-color:#bbffbb"
| 107|| August 3 || @ Royals || 8–2||Radke ||de la Rosa || ||12,022 ||62–45
|- style="background-color:#bbffbb"
| 108|| August 4 || @ Royals || 8–5||Reyes ||Dohmann ||Nathan ||19,394 ||63–45
|- style="background-color:#bbffbb"
| 109|| August 5 || @ Royals || 14–3||Silva ||Hernández || ||25,131 ||64–45
|- style="background-color:#bbffbb"
| 110|| August 6 || @ Royals || 11–5||Reyes ||Wellemeyer || ||14,064 ||65–45
|- style="background-color:#ffbbbb"
| 111|| August 7 || @ Tigers || 9–3||Miner ||Liriano || ||34,870 ||65–46
|- style="background-color:#bbffbb"
| 112|| August 8 || @ Tigers || 4–2||Radke ||Robertson ||Nathan ||35,624 ||66–46
|- style="background-color:#bbffbb"
| 113|| August 9 || @ Tigers || 4–3||Santana ||Zumaya ||Nathan ||36,339 ||67–46
|- style="background-color:#ffbbbb"
| 114|| August 10 || Blue Jays || 5–0||Lilly ||Silva || ||30,118 ||67–47
|- style="background-color:#ffbbbb"
| 115|| August 11 || Blue Jays || 7–1||Burnett ||Garza || ||31,814 ||67–48
|- style="background-color:#ffbbbb"
| 116|| August 12 || Blue Jays || 4–0||Downs ||Bonser || ||36,261 ||67–49
|- style="background-color:#bbffbb"
| 117|| August 13 || Blue Jays || 5–0||Radke ||Marcum || ||32,811 ||68–49
|- style="background-color:#bbffbb"
| 118|| August 15 || Indians || 4–1||Santana ||Westbrook || ||34,854 ||69–49
|- style="background-color:#bbffbb"
| 119|| August 16 || Indians || 7–2||Neshek ||Carmona || ||42,328 ||70–49
|- style="background-color:#ffbbbb"
| 120|| August 17 || Indians || 3–2||Byrd ||Garza || ||27,664 ||70–50
|- style="background-color:#bbffbb"
| 121|| August 18 || White Sox || 7–3||Neshek ||García || ||43,204 ||71–50
|- style="background-color:#ffbbbb"
| 122|| August 19 || White Sox || 4–1||Garland ||Radke ||Jenks ||46,215 ||71–51
|- style="background-color:#bbffbb"
| 123|| August 20 || White Sox || 7–3||Santana ||Vázquez || ||42,537 ||72–51
|- style="background-color:#ffbbbb"
| 124|| August 22 || @ Orioles || 6–3||Loewen ||Silva ||Ray ||19,756 ||72–52
|- style="background-color:#bbffbb"
| 125|| August 23 || @ Orioles || 4–1||Garza ||López ||Nathan ||19,258 ||73–52
|- style="background-color:#bbffbb"
| 126|| August 24 || @ Orioles || 11–2||Bonser ||Benson || ||24,848 ||74–52
|- style="background-color:#bbffbb"
| 127|| August 25 || @ White Sox || 5–4||Crain ||MacDougal ||Nathan ||35,931 ||75–52
|- style="background-color:#bbffbb"
| 128|| August 26 || @ White Sox || 8–7||Eyre ||Thornton || ||38,636 ||76–52
|- style="background-color:#ffbbbb"
| 129|| August 27 || @ White Sox || 6–1||Buehrle ||Silva || ||35,193 ||76–53
|- style="background-color:#ffbbbb"
| 130|| August 29 || Royals || 2–0||Redman ||Garza || ||24,904 ||76–54
|- style="background-color:#ffbbbb"
| 131|| August 30 || Royals || 4–3||Hudson ||Bonser ||Nelson ||28,668 ||76–55
|- style="background-color:#bbffbb"
| 132|| August 31 || Royals || 3–1||Santana ||de la Rosa ||Nathan ||21,287 ||77–55

|- style="background-color:#ffbbbb"
| 133 || September 1 || @ Yankees || 8–1||Lidle ||Silva || ||54,311 ||77–56
|- style="background-color:#bbffbb"
| 134|| September 2 || @ Yankees || 6–1||Baker ||Karstens ||Crain ||53,220 ||78–56
|- style="background-color:#ffbbbb"
| 135|| September 3 || @ Yankees || 10–1||Rasner ||Garza || ||55,155 ||78–57
|- style="background-color:#bbffbb"
| 136|| September 4 || @ Devil Rays || 2–1||Bonser ||Corcoran ||Nathan ||15,910 ||79–57
|- style="background-color:#bbffbb"
| 137|| September 5 || @ Devil Rays || 8–0||Santana ||Seo || ||8,256 ||80–57
|- style="background-color:#ffbbbb"
| 138|| September 6 || @ Devil Rays || 4–2||Shawn Camp ||Neshek ||McClung ||8,492 ||80–58
|- style="background-color:#ffbbbb"
| 139|| September 7 || Tigers || 7–2||Verlander ||Baker || ||21,229 ||80–59
|- style="background-color:#bbffbb"
| 140|| September 8 || Tigers || 9–5||Neshek ||Ledezma || ||29,042 ||81–59
|- style="background-color:#bbffbb"
| 141|| September 9 || Tigers || 2–1||Bonser ||Robertson ||Nathan ||39,160 ||82–59
|- style="background-color:#bbffbb"
| 142|| September 10 || Tigers || 12–1||Santana ||Bonderman || ||40,158 ||83–59
|- style="background-color:#bbffbb"
| 143|| September 11 || Athletics || 9–4||Silva ||Blanton ||Nathan ||15,728 ||84–59
|- style="background-color:#bbffbb"
| 144 || September 12 || Athletics || 7–5||Reyes ||Kennedy ||Nathan ||20,991 ||85–59
|- style="background-color:#ffbbbb"
| 145|| September 13 || Athletics || 1–0||Haren ||Garza ||Street ||18,902 ||85–60
|- style="background-color:#bbffbb"
| 146|| September 14 || @ Indians || 9–4||Crain ||Davis || ||21,424 ||86–60
|- style="background-color:#ffbbbb"
| 147|| September 15 || @ Indians || 5–4||Cabrera ||Neshek || ||32,473 ||86–61
|- style="background-color:#bbffbb"
| 148|| September 16 || @ Indians || 4–1||Silva ||Sabathia ||Nathan ||26,757 ||87–61
|- style="background-color:#bbffbb"
| 149|| September 17 || @ Indians || 6–1||Baker ||Byrd || Guerrier ||20,324 ||88–61
|- style="background-color:#bbffbb"
| 150|| September 19 || @ Red Sox || 7–3||Garza ||Wakefield || ||36,242 ||89–61
|- style="background-color:#bbffbb"
| 151|| September 20 || @ Red Sox || 8–2||Bonser ||Hansen || ||36,484 ||90–61
|- style="background-color:#ffbbbb"
| 152|| September 21 || @ Red Sox || 6–0||Beckett ||Santana || ||36,434 ||90–62
|- style="background-color:#ffbbbb"
| 153|| September 22 || @ Orioles || 7–3||Cabrera ||Silva || ||21,051 ||90–63
|- style="background-color:#bbffbb"
| 154|| September 23 || @ Orioles || 8–5||Guerrier ||Bédard ||Nathan ||21,980 ||91–63
|- style="background-color:#bbffbb"
| 155|| September 24 || @ Orioles || 6–3||Garza ||Loewen ||Nathan ||23,005 ||92–63
|- style="background-color:#bbffbb"
| 156|| September 25 || Royals || 8–1||Bonser ||de la Rosa || ||18,108 ||93–63
|- style="background-color:#bbffbb"
| 157|| September 26 || Royals || 3–2||Santana ||Peralta ||Nathan ||24,819 ||94–63
|- style="background-color:#ffbbbb"
| 158|| September 27 || Royals || 6–4||Redman ||Silva ||Nelson ||28,540 ||94–64
|- style="background-color:#bbffbb"
| 159|| September 28 || Royals || 2–1||Nathan ||Dohmann || ||26,254 ||95–64
|- style="background-color:#ffbbbb"
| 160|| September 29 || White Sox || 4–3||Freddy García ||Bonser ||Jenks ||45,439 ||95–65
|- style="background-color:#ffbbbb"
| 161|| September 30 || White Sox || 6–3||Garland ||Garza || ||46,219 ||95–66
|- style="background-color:#bbffbb"
| 162|| October 1 || White Sox || 5–1||Silva' ||Vázquez || ||45,182 ||96–66

Team overview
Offense: Power and the Piranhas

For the first time since 1987, the Twins had legitimate power hitters in Justin Morneau, Torii Hunter, and Michael Cuddyer.  On August 9, Morneau became the first Twin to hit 30 or more home runs since 1987, when Tom Brunansky, Gary Gaetti, and Kent Hrbek did it. The Twins led the Major Leagues in batting average with a team average of .287.

During the same span:
Every other team in the majors had at least three 30-homer hitters.
Nine teams had 20 or more 30-homer hitters.
478 players, including 14 in 2006, hit 30 or more home runs in a season.
138 players hit 40 or more homers. Twenty of those reached 50.
Morneau finished the season with 34 home runs, 130 runs batted in, and a .321 average and was named American League MVP.

Both Morneau and Joe Mauer won their first Silver Slugger Awards.

Hunter enjoyed a late season surge to also reach the 30 home run mark.  On September 25, he homered off Kansas City Royals pitcher Zack Greinke in the bottom of the 7th inning and became the second Twin to hit 30 home runs in 2006.  He finished the season with 31 home runs and 98 runs batted in.

Michael Cuddyer also had a breakout season as the Twins' cleanup hitter.  He did not start the season as a regular player, but eventually replaced the ineffective opening day right fielder, Jason Kubel.  By June, he was hitting fourth in the lineup, and he finished the season with 24 home runs, 109 runs batted in, scored 102 runs, and hit for a .284 average.

Morneau and catcher Joe Mauer may have finally earned the nickname "The M&M Boys", that had been prematurely applied to them early in the 2005 season.  (This was the nickname applied to Mickey Mantle and Roger Maris in the early 1960s.)  Not only did Mauer win the American League batting title, but he led the major leagues with a .347 average, finishing ahead of National League champion Freddy Sanchez.  Mauer was the first catcher to lead either the American League or the majors in hitting.  Two catchers did win the National League batting title. Bubbles Hargrave of the Cincinnati Reds did it in 1926. Ernie Lombardi led the National League twice: once for the Reds in 1938 and once for the Boston Braves in 1942.  However, neither catcher won the major league title.

These strong hitters were complemented by the top and bottom of the Twins' order, where the players gave the hitters plenty of opportunities to drive in runs.  Midway through the season, the Twins opted for a lineup that included Jason Tyner batting eighth, Jason Bartlett ninth, Luis Castillo first, and Nick Punto second.  Manager Ron Gardenhire said that these players were like four leadoff hitters: all were fast and hit for average but not power.  All four hit between .290 (Punto) and .312 (Tyner), but hit a combined six home runs.

Players like this caused Chicago White Sox manager Ozzie Guillén to dub the team "the piranhas." Said Guillen:

Despite the fact that the term came from a rival manager, it was quickly embraced by both the players and the fans, as well as media outlets such as ESPN.  After running a popular "Twins Territory" commercial in 2007 featuring Jason Bartlett and Nick Punto at the Mall of America's Underwater World as "Piranhas"  the Minnesota Twins organization marketed official T-shirts, hats, signs, the team even had a "Little Piranha Night" in which piranha finger puppets were given to fans attending the game that evening.

The four finished their MLB careers hitting a combined .274 and just 79 HRs in 14,262 at-bats.

 *Major League Leader

Pitching

For much of the season, the Twins' starting rotation was its most apparent weakness.  This is surprising, because the 2005 Minnesota Twins had one of the strongest rotations in baseball.  The team started the season with a rotation of Johan Santana, Brad Radke, Carlos Silva, Kyle Lohse, and Scott Baker.  By September, only Santana could be counted on for a full, effective start.

Baker was not effective and was quickly demoted to the minors, though he came back a couple times and had a couple competent starts.  Lohse was ineffective, surly, and traded to the Cincinnati Reds midway through the season.  Radke started slowly but seemed to find his form, providing some consistency to the number two spot before being sidelined with a torn labrum and a stress fracture in his right shoulder.  Silva was unable to find his 2005 form, finishing the season with an ERA of 5.94.  He did make a few strong starts in September before regressing.

On May 19, talented rookie Francisco Liriano entered the starting rotation.  He pitched well enough to earn an All-Star berth, finishing with a 12-3 record and a minuscule ERA of 2.16.  Unfortunately, he was sidelined after the All-Star break with elbow problems.  He did not pitch at all in 2007, as he was recovering from Tommy John surgery. Boof Bonser had an up-and-down season, but finished strong with a 7-6 record and 4.22 ERA.  This earned him a spot in the postseason rotation. Matt Garza was the team's top pitching prospect, but was inconsistent during his first partial year in the majors.

The Twins had one of baseball's best bullpens. Dennys Reyes, signed to a minor-league deal during the offseason, provided a pleasant surprise with an excellent season as the Twins' sole left-handed reliever. Right-handers Jesse Crain and Juan Rincón set the stage throughout the season for closer Joe Nathan, with homegrown rookie Pat Neshek contributing some solid innings after being recalled from the minor leagues in July.  Pitchers like Willie Eyre and Matt Guerrier ate up innings when the starters faltered.

In the May 27 game against Seattle, Jesse Crain – with a lead – loaded the bases with no outs in the eighth. Juan Rincón replaced Crain, and promptly ended the threat – with just one pitch – by inducing Mariner Kenji Johjima to hit into a triple play.  Rincon threw 26 more pitches in the ninth for the save.

 *Tied for league lead 1Led leagueDefense

The Twins finished tied for second place in the American League with a .986 fielding percentage.  The team's defense was noticeably stronger when the left side of the infield was revamped in June, when the team traded shortstop Juan Castro to Cincinnati and released third baseman Tony Batista. Jason Bartlett and Nick Punto stepped into those roles, providing an immediate upgrade.

In center field, Torii Hunter won his sixth Gold Glove Award.

Player stats
Batting

Starters by positionNote: Pos = Position; G = Games played; AB = At bats; H = Hits; Avg. = Batting average; HR = Home runs; RBI = Runs batted inOther battersNote: G = Games played; AB = At bats; H = Hits; Avg. = Batting average; HR = Home runs; RBI = Runs batted inPitching

Starting pitchersNote: G = Games pitched; IP = Innings pitched; W = Wins; L = Losses; ERA = Earned run average; SO = StrikeoutsOther pitchersNote: G = Games pitched; IP = Innings pitched; W = Wins; L = Losses; ERA = Earned run average; SO = StrikeoutsRelief pitchersNote: G = Games pitched; W = Wins; L = Losses; SV = Saves; ERA = Earned run average; SO = StrikeoutsPlayoffs

After the Twins won the division, the American League playoff matchups were decided as follows: number two seed Minnesota Twins hosting number three seed Oakland Athletics, and number one seed New York Yankees hosting the wild card Detroit Tigers.

The Twins were defeated by Oakland in a three-game sweep, ending their playoff run for 2006.  The Twins got great starts from both Johan Santana and Boof Bonser (who made his first post season appearance) at the Metrodome.  After losing game 1 by the score of 3-2, the Twins came back to even the score at 2 in game 2.  With two outs and a runner on first in the top of the 7th inning, Mark Kotsay hit a line drive to center field that Torii Hunter made a valiant dive for.  Unfortunately, the ball sailed past him all the way to the wall, resulting in an inside-the-park home run for Kotsay.  This play seemed to take all the momentum away from the Twins.  The Twins never led in any game in this series.

Other post-season awards
Calvin R. Griffith Award (Most Valuable Twin) – Justin Morneau
Joseph W. Haynes Award (Twins Pitcher of the Year) – Johan Santana
Bill Boni Award (Twins Outstanding Rookie) – Francisco Liriano
Charles O. Johnson Award (Most Improved Twin) – Michael Cuddyer
Dick Siebert Award (Upper Midwest Player of the Year) – Joe Mauer
Bob Allison Award (Leadership Award) – Brad Radke
Mike Augustin Award ("Media Good Guy" Award) – Torii HunterThe above awards are voted on by the Twin Cities chapter of the BBWAACarl R. Pohlad Award (Outstanding Community Service) – Michael Cuddyer
Sherry Robertson Award (Twins Outstanding Farm System Position Player) – Alexi Casilla
Jim Rantz Award (Twins Outstanding Farm System Pitcher) – Matt Garza
Kirby Puckett Award (Alumni Community Service) – Harmon Killebrew
Herb Carneal Award (Lifetime Achievement Award)'' – Herb Carneal

Farm system

External links

Player stats from www.baseball-reference.com
Team info from www.baseball-almanac.com
Up to date standings from MLB.com
Team leaders from Yahoo!

References

Minnesota Twins seasons
Minnesota Twins season
American League Central champion seasons
Minnesota Twins